The Youth Opportunities Programme was a UK government scheme for helping 16- to 18-year-olds into employment. It was introduced in 1978 under the Labour government of James Callaghan, was expanded in 1980 by Margaret Thatcher's Conservative government, and ran until 1983 when it was replaced by the Youth Training Scheme.

People taking part in the YOP scheme were informally known as "YOPpers", or "Yoppies".

References

External links
 Youth Policies in the UK: A Chronological Map, Keele University

Employment in the United Kingdom
History of education in the United Kingdom
1978 establishments in the United Kingdom
1983 disestablishments in the United Kingdom
Programmes of the Government of the United Kingdom
Political history of the United Kingdom
Youth employment
Youth in the United Kingdom